Çatalhöyük (also Çatal Höyük and Çatal Hüyük; from Turkish çatal "fork" + höyük "tumulus") is a tell of a very large Neolithic and Chalcolithic proto-city settlement in southern Anatolia, which existed from approximately 7500 BC to 6400 BC, and flourished around 7000 BC. In July 2012, it was inscribed as a UNESCO World Heritage Site.

Çatalhöyük is located overlooking the Konya Plain, southeast of the present-day city of Konya (ancient Iconium) in Turkey, approximately 140 km (87 mi) from the twin-coned volcano of Mount Hasan. The eastern settlement forms a mound that would have risen about 20 m (66 ft) above the plain at the time of the latest Neolithic occupation. There is also a smaller settlement mound to the west and a Byzantine settlement a few hundred meters to the east. The prehistoric mound settlements were abandoned before the Bronze Age. A channel of the Çarşamba River once flowed between the two mounds, and the settlement was built on alluvial clay which may have been favorable for early agriculture.

Archaeology

The site was first excavated by James Mellaart in 1958. He later led a team which further excavated there for four seasons between 1961 and 1965. These excavations revealed this section of Anatolia as a centre of advanced culture in the Neolithic period. Excavation revealed 18 successive layers of buildings signifying various stages of the settlement and eras of history. The bottom layer of buildings can be dated as early as 7100 BC while the top layer is from 5600 BC.

Mellaart was banned from Turkey for his involvement in the Dorak affair in which he published drawings of supposedly important Bronze Age artifacts that later went missing. After this scandal, the site lay idle until 1993, when investigations began under the leadership of Ian Hodder, then at the University of Cambridge. The Hodder led excavations ended in 2018. Hodder, a former student of Mellaart, chose the site as the first "real world" test of his then-controversial theory of post-processual archaeology. The site has always had a strong research emphasis upon engagement with digital methodologies, driven by the project's experimental and reflexive methodological framework. According to Mickel, Hodder's Çatalhöyük Research Project (ÇRP) established itself as a site for progressive methodologies - in terms of adaptable and democratized recording, integration of computerized technologies, sampling strategies, and community involvement."

New excavations are being directed by Ali Umut Türkcan from Anadolu University.

Culture

 

Çatalhöyük was composed entirely of domestic buildings, with no obvious public buildings. While some of the larger ones have rather ornate murals, the purpose of some rooms remains unclear.

The population of the eastern mound has been estimated to be around 10,000 people, but the population likely varied over the community's history. An average population of between 5,000 and 7,000 is a reasonable estimate. The sites were set up as large numbers of buildings clustered together. Households looked to their neighbors for help, trade, and possible marriage for their children. The inhabitants lived in mudbrick houses that were crammed together in an aggregate structure. No footpaths or streets were used between the dwellings, which were clustered in a honeycomb-like maze. Most were accessed by holes in the ceiling and doors on the side of the houses, with doors reached by ladders and stairs. The rooftops were effectively streets. The ceiling openings also served as the only source of ventilation, allowing smoke from the houses' open hearths and ovens to escape. 

Houses had plaster interiors characterized by squared-off timber ladders or steep stairs. These were usually on the south wall of the room, as were cooking hearths and ovens. The main rooms contained raised platforms that may have been used for a range of domestic activities. Typical houses contained two rooms for everyday activity, such as cooking and crafting. All interior walls and platforms were plastered to a smooth finish. Ancillary rooms were used as storage, and were accessed through low openings from main rooms.

All rooms were kept scrupulously clean. Archaeologists identified very little rubbish in the buildings, finding middens outside the ruins, with sewage and food waste, as well as significant amounts of ash from burning wood, reeds and animal dung. In good weather, many daily activities may also have taken place on the rooftops, which may have formed a plaza. In later periods, large communal ovens appear to have been built on these rooftops. Over time, houses were renewed by partial demolition and rebuilding on a foundation of rubble, which was how the mound was gradually built up. As many as eighteen levels of settlement have been uncovered.

As a part of ritual life, the people of Çatalhöyük buried their dead within the village. Human remains have been found in pits beneath the floors and, especially, beneath hearths, the platforms within the main rooms, and under beds. Bodies were tightly flexed before burial and were often placed in baskets or wound and wrapped in reed mats. Disarticulated bones in some graves suggest that bodies may have been exposed in the open air for a time before the bones were gathered and buried. In some cases, graves were disturbed, and the individual's head removed from the skeleton. These heads may have been used in rituals, as some were found in other areas of the community. In a woman's grave spinning whorls were recovered and in a man's grave, stone axes. Some skulls were plastered and painted with ochre to recreate faces, a custom more characteristic of Neolithic sites in Syria and at Neolithic Jericho than at sites closer by.

Vivid murals and figurines are found throughout the settlement, on interior and exterior walls. Distinctive clay figurines of women, notably the Seated Woman of Çatalhöyük, have been found in the upper levels of the site. Although no identifiable temples have been found, the graves, murals, and figurines suggest that the people of Çatalhöyük had a religion rich in symbols. Rooms with concentrations of these items may have been shrines or public meeting areas. Predominant images include men with erect phalluses, hunting scenes, red images of the now extinct aurochs (wild cattle) and stags, and vultures swooping down on headless figures. Relief figures are carved on walls, such as of lionesses facing one another.

Heads of animals, especially of cattle, were mounted on walls. A painting of the village, with the twin mountain peaks of Hasan Dağ in the background, is frequently cited as the world's oldest map, and the first landscape painting. However, some archaeologists question this interpretation. Stephanie Meece, for example, argues that it is more likely a painting of a leopard skin instead of a volcano, and a decorative geometric design instead of a map.

Religion

A feature of Çatalhöyük are its female figurines.  Mellaart, the original excavator, argued that these carefully made figurines, carved and molded from marble, blue and brown limestone, schist, calcite, basalt, alabaster, and clay, represented a female deity. Although a male deity existed as well, "statues of a female deity far outnumber those of the male deity, who moreover, does not appear to be represented at all after Level VI". To date, eighteen levels have been identified. These figurines were found primarily in areas Mellaart believed to be shrines. The stately goddess seated on a throne flanked by two lionesses was found in a grain bin, which Mellaart suggests might have been a means of ensuring the harvest or protecting the food supply.

Whereas Mellaart excavated nearly two hundred buildings in four seasons, the current excavator, Ian Hodder, spent an entire season excavating one building alone. Hodder and his team, in 2004 and 2005, began to believe that the patterns suggested by Mellaart were false.  They found one similar figurine, but the vast majority did not imitate the Mother Goddess style that Mellaart suggested. Instead of a Mother Goddess culture, Hodder points out that the site gives little indication of a matriarchy or patriarchy.

In an article in the Turkish Daily News, Hodder is reported as denying that Çatalhöyük was a matriarchal society and quoted as saying "When we look at what they eat and drink and at their social statues, we see that men and women had the same social status. There was a balance of power. Another example is the skulls found. If one's social status was of high importance in Çatalhöyük, the body and head were separated after death. The number of female and male skulls found during the excavations is almost equal." In another article in the Hurriyet Daily News Hodder is reported to say "We have learned that men and women were equally approached".

In a report in September 2009 on the discovery of around 2000 figurines Hodder is quoted as saying:

Professor Lynn Meskell explained that while the original excavations had found only 200 figures, the new excavations had uncovered 2,000 figures, most of which depicted animals, and fewer than 5% of the figurines depicted women.

Estonian folklorist Uku Masing has suggested as early as in 1976, that Çatalhöyük was probably a hunting and gathering religion and the Mother Goddess figurine did not represent a female deity. He implied that perhaps a longer period of time was needed to develop symbols for agricultural rites. His theory was developed in the paper "Some remarks on the mythology of the people of Catal Hüyük".

Economy 
Çatalhöyük has strong evidence of an egalitarian society, as no houses with distinctive features (belonging to royalty or religious hierarchy, for example) have been found so far.  The most recent investigations also reveal little social distinction based on gender, with men and women receiving equivalent nutrition and seeming to have equal social status, as typically found in Paleolithic cultures. Children observed domestic areas. They learned how to perform rituals and how to build or repair houses by watching the adults make statues, beads and other objects.
Çatalhöyük's spatial layout may be due to the close kin relations exhibited amongst the people. It can be seen, in the layout, that the people were "divided into two groups who lived on opposite sides of the town, separated by a gully." Furthermore, because no nearby towns were found from which marriage partners could be drawn, "this spatial separation must have marked two intermarrying kinship groups." This would help explain how a settlement so early on would become so large.

In the upper levels of the site, it becomes apparent that the people of Çatalhöyük were gaining skills in agriculture and the domestication of animals. Female figurines have been found within bins used for storage of cereals, such as wheat and barley, and the figurines are presumed to be of a deity protecting the grain. Peas were also grown, and almonds, pistachios and fruit were harvested from trees in the surrounding hills. Sheep were domesticated and evidence suggests the beginning of cattle domestication as well.  However, hunting continued to be a major source of food for the community. Pottery and obsidian tools appear to have been major industries; obsidian tools were probably both used and also traded for items such as Mediterranean sea shells and flint from Syria. Noting the lack of hierarchy and economic inequality, historian and anti-capitalist author Murray Bookchin has argued that Çatalhöyük was an early example of anarcho-communism.

Conversely, a 2014 paper argues that the picture of Çatalhöyük is more complex and that while there seemed to have been an egalitarian distribution of cooking tools and some stone tools, unbroken quern-stones and storage units were more unevenly distributed, indicating social inequality. Private property existed but shared tools also existed. It was also suggested that Çatalhöyük was slowly becoming less egalitarian, with greater inter-generational wealth transmission, though there may have been efforts to try to stop this.

See also
Boncuklu Höyük
Cities of the ancient Near East
Cucuteni–Trypillian culture
Göbekli Tepe
Kamyana Mohyla
List of largest cities throughout history
List of Stone Age art
Matriarchy
Neolithic Revolution
Old Europe (archaeology)
Sacred bull
Venus figurines

References

Sources
 Bailey, Douglass. Prehistoric Figurines: Representation and Corporeality in the Neolithic. New York: Routledge, 2005 (hardcover, ; paperback).
 Balter, Michael. The Goddess and the Bull: Çatalhöyük: An Archaeological Journey to the Dawn of Civilization. New York: Free Press, 2004 (hardcover); Walnut Creek, CA: Left Coast Press, 2006 (paperback). A highly condensed version was published in The Smithsonian Magazine, May 2005.
 Dural, Sadrettin. "Protecting Catalhoyuk: Memoir of an Archaeological Site Guard." Contributions by Ian Hodder.  Translated by Duygu Camurcuoglu Cleere.  Walnut Creek, CA: Left Coast Press, 2007. .
 Hodder, Ian. "Women and Men at Çatalhöyük," Scientific American Magazine, January 2004 (update V15:1, 2005).
 Hodder, I. (2014). "Çatalhöyük excavations: the 2000-2008 seasons.", British Institute at Ankara, Monumenta Archaeologica 29, 
 Hodder, Ian. Twenty-Five Years of Research at Çatalhöyük, Near Eastern Archaeology; Chicago, vol. 83, iss. 2, pp. 72–29, June 2020
 Hodder, Ian. The Leopard's Tale: Revealing the Mysteries of Çatalhöyük. London; New York: Thames & Hudson, 2006 (hardcover). (The UK title of this work is Çatalhöyük: The Leopard's Tale.)
Mallett, Marla, "The Goddess from Anatolia:  An Updated View of the Catak Huyuk Controversy," in Oriental Rug Review, Vol. XIII, No. 2 (December 1992/January 1993).
 Mellaart, James. Çatal Hüyük: A Neolithic Town in Anatolia. London: Thames & Hudson, 1967; New York: McGraw-Hill Book Company, 1967. Online at archive.org
 On the Surface: Çatalhöyük 1993–95, edited by Ian Hodder. Cambridge: McDonald Institute for Archaeological Research and British Institute of Archaeology at Ankara, 1996.
 
 Todd, Ian A. Çatal Hüyük in Perspective. Menlo Park, CA: Cummings Pub. Co., 1976.

External links

What we learned from 25 Years of Research at Catalhoyuk - Ian Hodder - Oriental Institute lecture Dec 4, 2019
 Çatalhöyük — Excavations of a Neolithic Anatolian Höyük, Çatalhöyük excavation official website
 Çatalhöyük photos
 The First Cities: Why Settle Down? The Mystery of Communities, by Michael Balter, Çatalhöyük excavation official biographer
 Interview with Ian Hodder March 201 "Ian Hodder: Çatalhöyük, Religion & Templeton's 25%"

Anatolia
Archaeological museums in Turkey
Archaeological sites in Central Anatolia
Archaeological sites of prehistoric Anatolia
Buildings and structures in Konya Province
Chalcolithic sites of Asia
Former populated places in Turkey
Museums in Konya Province
Neolithic settlements
Neolithic sites of Asia
Megasites
Populated places established in the 8th millennium BC